The following is a list of notable people associated with the University of Southern Mississippi, located in the American city of Hattiesburg, Mississippi.

Notable alumni

Politics and government

Media and the arts

Natalie Allen '84 – CNN International Anchor, CNN Newsroom, Southern Miss Alumni Award Winner
Patrik-Ian Polk '94 – producer, filmmaker, and artist
 Jimmy Buffett '69 – singer, songwriter, and author
 Cat Cora – celebrity chef, Iron Chef America on Food Network
 Gary Grubbs '72 – actor, JFK, The Astronaut's Wife, The O. C., Will & Grace
 Ed Hinton '70 – sportswriter for ESPN.com
 Eddie Hodges (B.S. Psychology '73, M.S. Counseling '75) – former child actor, The Music Man on Broadway, numerous movie and TV roles; pop singer and songwriter; mental health counselor
 John Holman '83 – short story writer, novelist, and academic
 Cooper Huckabee – actor
 Clifton Hyde – musician, Blue Man Group
 Nan Kelley – host of Grand Ole Opry Live, GAC Network; Miss Mississippi
 Tom Malone – musician, CBS Orchestra, Late Show with David Letterman, Blues Brothers Band
 Whitney Miller '11 – winner of the first MasterChef title from season one of the Fox television show; author of cookbook Modern Hospitality: Simple Recipes with Southern Charm
 Michael Holloway Perronne – novelist
 Sally-Ann Roberts – anchor for WWL-TV in New Orleans
 Jameson Rodgers – country music singer, songwriter
 Phillip Sandifer – singer/songwriter
 Chuck Scarborough – Emmy award-winning anchor at WNBC-TV in New York City; author
 David Sheffield '72 – comedy writer; screenwriter for Saturday Night Live, writing mostly for Eddie Murphy and Joe Piscopo; wrote screenplays for Hollywood movies, including Police Academy II and Coming to America
 Dalton Smith '59 – Grammy Award Winning trumpeter with Stan Kenton
 Tom Smith '79 – musician, Jazz Education Hall of Fame
 Ugly God – Rapper, songwriter, record producer and featured on the 2017 XXL Freshman list.
 Steve Wiest '80 – musician, jazz trombonist with Maynard Ferguson; Grammy-nominated composer, arranger; director of the One O'Clock Lab Band
 Nanette Workman – singer
 Clymer Wright – Editor of Fort Bend Reporter in Fort Bend County, Texas; later conservative political activist in Houston
 William Garrett Wright – poet

Military
Major General Jeffery Hammond 1978, 1986 – led one of the initial battalions into Bosnia in enforcement of the Dayton Peace Accords, served as the commander of U.S. forces in Baghdad, where he served 33,000 troops of the U.S. Army 4th Infantry Division and Multi-National Division Baghdad
 Rear Admiral (United States) Francis D. "Bill" Moran 1961 – third director of the National Oceanic and Atmospheric Administration Commissioned Officer Corps
Colonel Ronald J. Rabin – commissioned as a second lieutenant of infantry from the ROTC program at Mississippi Southern College (now the University of Southern Mississippi)
Major General Walter H. Yates, Jr. –  multiple military decorations

Science and technology
Roger Brent '73 – systems biologist at Fred Hutchinson Cancer Research Center
Robert Hyatt '83 – author of Cray Blitz, a world chess champion computer program
Robert L. Stewart '64 – former NASA astronaut; retired Army brigadier general

Sports people

Others
Lloyd Donald Brinkman '52 – (1929–2015), businessman, cattle breeder, civic leader and art collector
Frances E. Lee, Professor of Politics, Princeton University
Hannah Roberts, Miss Mississippi 2015 and 1st runner-up to Miss America 2016

Notable faculty

Gordon Gunter (1909–1998) – director (1955–1971) and director emeritus (1971–1979) of the university′s Gulf Coast Research Laboratory in Ocean Springs; influential fisheries scientist who pioneered the study of fisheries in the northern Gulf of Mexico
William K. Scarborough professor emeritus of History

References

University of Southern Mississippi people